Bruce Eric McPhail (26 January 1937 – 21 July 2020) was a New Zealand rugby union player. A wing, McPhail represented Mid Canterbury, Canterbury, and Nelson at a provincial level, and was a member of the New Zealand national side, the All Blacks, in 1959. He played two matches for the All Blacks, both of them tests against the touring British Lions.

McPhail died in Hamilton on 21 July 2020.

References

1937 births
2020 deaths
Rugby union players from Ashburton, New Zealand
People educated at Ashburton College
New Zealand rugby union players
New Zealand international rugby union players
Mid Canterbury rugby union players
Canterbury rugby union players
Nelson rugby union players
Rugby union wings